South Tuya, also called Southern Tuya, is a tuya clustered around Tuya Lake in the Northern Cordilleran Volcanic Province in British Columbia, Canada. The base of South Tuya comprises hyaloclastite and pillow lava indicating that the volcano formed beneath a large lake or beneath ice.

See also
 List of volcanoes in Canada
 List of Northern Cordilleran volcanoes
 Volcanism of Canada
 Volcanism of Western Canada

References

Volcanoes of British Columbia
One-thousanders of British Columbia
Cassiar Country
Stikine Ranges
Pleistocene volcanoes
Monogenetic volcanoes
Northern Cordilleran Volcanic Province
Tuyas of Canada